Ririe Jr./Sr. High School is a public school in Ririe, Idaho.

It was the first school in USA history to sue to withdraw from a county School District.  It won the suit in 1963 and formed its own independent school district, #252, with its own superintendent and school board.

History

Ririe High School has been a member of the Northwest Association of Accredited Schools since 1945.

Campus
The Jr/Sr High School consists of two buildings. The main building consists of grades 7–8 on the north wing and grades 9–12 on the south wing. There is also an Ag shop where vocational classes are taught.

Extracurricular activities
Activities available to Ririe students include FFA, Wrestling, Boys Basketball, Girls Basketball, Track and Field, Volleyball, Cheerleading,  band, choir, dance team, drama, golf, and scholastic bowl.

Athletics
The Ririe Bulldogs compete in the Nuclear Conference in the Idaho High School Activities Association 2A class.

Curriculum
In addition to its regular curriculum, Ririe students can take vocational courses through Eastern Idaho Technical College.

References

External links
Ririe Junior Senior High School

Public high schools in Idaho
Schools in Jefferson County, Idaho